WKDI (840 AM, 100.5 FM) is a radio station broadcasting a southern gospel format. Licensed to Denton, Maryland, United States, the station is currently owned by Positive Alternative Radio, Inc.

The station, and its FM translator, flipped from brokered religious/contemporary Christian music programming to its current southern gospel format in June 2019.

External links

Christianity in Maryland
Denton, Maryland
KDI
KDI